The 1978–79 season was Mansfield Town's 42nd season in the Football League and 14th in the Third Division they finished in 18th position with 43 points.

Final league table

Results

Football League Third Division

FA Cup

League Cup

Anglo-Scottish Cup

Squad statistics
 Squad list sourced from

References
General
 Mansfield Town 1978–79 at soccerbase.com (use drop down list to select relevant season)

Specific

Mansfield Town F.C. seasons
Mansfield Town